Jerry Ricardo Bengtson Bodden (born 8 April 1987) is a Honduran professional footballer who plays as a striker for Olimpia and the Honduras national team.

Club career

Vida 
On 12 August 2007, Bengtson made his official debut for C.D.S. Vida against Olimpia. He scored his first goal against Real España on 30 September 2007 in the 1–1 tie in San Pedro Sula. During his stay at Vida he scored 32 goals.

Motagua 
On 26 November 2010, F.C. Motagua reached an agreement with Vida, for the acquisition of Bengtson, signing a three-year contract. He scored his first goal with Motagua on 30 January 2011 in the 1–0 win over C.D. Marathón.

On 8 May 2011, Bengtson scored his 13th goal of the Clausura Tournament in the first leg of the final against Olimpia. This goal put him in first place among the league's top scorers and enabled him to become the first Honduran-born player to achieve the feat in three consecutive tournaments after winning the previous two with C.D. Vida. He would go on to score two more goals in the second leg to solidify his title as the league's top scorer.

In the early part of 2012, Jerry suffered his worst goal drought in his career in Honduras, scoring only 2 goals in 18 games. With the forthcoming 2014 FIFA World Cup qualification, the lack of goals concerned the Honduran people. This was because of Jerry's role as main goalscorer in the Honduras National Football Team, due to Carlo Costly being a free agent making him unreliable.

New England Revolution 

Bengtson was officially unveiled by New England as a Designated Player on 5 July 2012.

Persepolis 

Bengtson signed a one-year contract with Persepolis on 1 August 2015. He made his debut in the final 20 minutes of Persepolis' match against Sepahan. He scored his first goal for Persepolis on 25 September 2015 against Tractor Sazi. He scored Persepolis' only goal in a 1–1 draw against important rivals Esteghlal in the Tehran derby in stoppage time of second half.

Bengtson scored a brace on 22 April 2016, in a 2–0 victory against Esteghlal Ahvaz which kept Persepolis at the top of the table.

Zob Ahan
Bengtson signed with Persian Gulf Pro League side Zob Ahan in July 2016.

International career

He made his debut for Honduras in an April 2010 friendly match against Venezuela and has, as of November 2012, earned a total of 24 caps, scoring 14 goals. He has represented his country in 2 FIFA World Cup qualification matches and played at the 2012 London Olympics as well as at the 2011 CONCACAF Gold Cup.

International goals
Scores and results list Honduras' goal tally first.

Honours
Motagua
Liga Nacional:  2011 Clausura

Zob Ahan
Iranian Super Cup: 2016

Saprissa
Liga FPD: 2018 Clausura

Olimpia
Liga Nacional: 2021 Clausura

Individual
Top goalscorers of Liga Nacional de Honduras (3): 2009–10 Clausura, 2010–11 Apertura, 2010–11 Clausura

References

External links

1987 births
Living people
People from Colón Department (Honduras)
Association football forwards
Honduran footballers
Honduras international footballers
2011 CONCACAF Gold Cup players
Olympic footballers of Honduras
Footballers at the 2012 Summer Olympics
Garifuna people
C.D.S. Vida players
F.C. Motagua players
New England Revolution players
Liga Nacional de Fútbol Profesional de Honduras players
Persepolis F.C. players
Zob Ahan Esfahan F.C. players
Honduran expatriate footballers
Persian Gulf Pro League players
Major League Soccer players
Designated Players (MLS)
Deportivo Saprissa players
2013 Copa Centroamericana players
2014 FIFA World Cup players
2021 CONCACAF Gold Cup players
Club Atlético Belgrano footballers
Argentine Primera División players
Expatriate soccer players in the United States
Expatriate footballers in Iran
Expatriate footballers in Argentina
Honduran expatriate sportspeople in the United States
Honduran expatriate sportspeople in Iran
Honduran expatriate sportspeople in Argentina
C.D. Olimpia players